Mohali district, officially known as Sahibzada Ajit Singh Nagar district or SAS Nagar district, is one of the twenty three districts of Punjab, a state in north-west India. 
It was formed in April 2006 and is 18th district of Punjab, created next to Pathankot district. This district was carved out of areas falling in Ropar and Patiala District. It is situated next to the union territory of Chandigarh and Panchkula district of Haryana.

The district is officially named after Sahibzada Ajit Singh, the eldest son of Guru Gobind Singh.

History

Administrative divisions 

The district of SAS Nagar has three tehsils, all of which have sub-divisional status. These are Dera Bassi, Kharar and SAS Nagar-Mohali. There are four community development blocks (CDBs or 'blocks') that make up the district: Dera Bassi CDB, Kharar CDB, Majri CDB, and Rajpura CDB. Only part of Rajpura CDB is under the administrative control of SAS Nagar district; a portion of its area is contained within the Patiala district. SAS Nagar has fifteen towns; seven are statutory towns, and eight are census towns.

Community development blocks

Dera Bassi 
This block consists of 144 villages and two towns namely Zirakpur and Dera Bassi and there are six uninhabited villages. As per the 2001 census, the total population of the block is 216,921. The rural population of the block is 170192 out of which there are 93,116 males and 77,076 females. The total SC population in the rural area is 48,683.
Dera Bassi block has a good number of small scale units. Chemical paints, Steel tubes, plywood, handlooms, and knitting of Daris are some of the industries which have offered good employment to several persons. The soil of the block is sandy to sandy loam. There are a total of 25 branches are functioning in the block which comprises 19 commercial banks, one private bank, three cooperative banks, one Malwa Gramin Bank and one agricultural development bank.
Zirakpur and had a very fast development and has become a part of Greater Chandigarh.

Kharar 
This block consists of 154 villages and two towns namely Ajitgarh and Kharar and there are four uninhabited villages. As per the 2001 census, the total population of the block is 369,798. The rural population of the block is 196,044 out of which there are 106,688 males and 89,356 females. The total Scheduled Caste (SC) population in the rural area is 55,544.

Under the service area approach, all the villages have been allocated among 17 branches of commercial banks and four branches of RPBs.  There are a total of 86 branches are functioning in the block which comprises 57 commercial banks, 13 private banks, 11 cooperative banks, four Punjab Gramin Banks, and one Agricultural Development bank.  SAS Nagar has emerged as an Industrial Focal Point and designated as District Headquarters.  It has become a satellite town of Chandigarh and has registered a fast rate of growth.

Majri 
Majri Block comprises 116 villages one of which is uninhabited. This block forms part of the Kharar subdivision. The total population of the block is 111,598 as per the 2001 census. The population in the rural area is 88551, out of which 47,892 are males and 40,659 are female. The SC population in the rural area is 25,531. Kurali is the only town in the block and has a population of 23,047. This block is spread over an area . The block comes under the dark category. All the villages numbering 116 have been allocated among eight branches of commercial banks and one branch of P.G.B. 16 branches are operating in this block which comprises 9 branches of commercial banks. One private Sector Bank, One branch of PGB and SAS Nagar central co-operative bank have five branches. Due to certain incentives being initiated by the Government many large and small-scale industrial units have been established around Kurali.

Rajpura

Architecture

Fateh Burj 
The Fateh Burj is the tallest victory tower (Minar) in the country. The  tower is dedicated to the establishment of Sikh rule in India in 1711. It is also known as Baba Banda Singh Bahadur War Memorial. It was here that Banda Singh Bahadur, one of the most respected Sikh warriors, won a decisive battle against Wazir Khan, commander of the Mughal army.

Demographics 
According to the 2011 census, SAS Nagar district has a population of 994,628, roughly equal to the nation of Fiji or the US state of Montana. This gives it a ranking of 450th in India (out of a total of 640).
Its population growth rate over the decade 2001-2011 was 32.02%. SAS Nagar has a sex ratio of 878 females for every 1,000 males, and a literacy rate of 84.9%. Scheduled Castes made up 21.74% of the population.

At the time of the 2011 census, 94.69% of the population spoke Punjabi and 4.21% Hindi as their first language.

Weather 
Mohali has a subtropical climate where the summers are hot, the winters cold, because it is close to the mountains in Himachal, and the monsoons are mild to average.

In the monsoon months, the weather is hot and humid and the spring season is pleasant with a mild chill.

Politics

District areas 
Villages and towns within the district include:

 Mullanpur
 Zirakpur 
 New Chandigarh
 Kharar
 Bakarpur
 Bhankharpur
 Banur
 Chappar Chiri
 Cholta Kalan
 Daon
 Mubarik Pur
 Rampur Sanian
 Sohana
 Kurali
 Kumbhra
 Dera Bassi
 Mattaur
 Tewar (Tiaur)
 Nayagaon
 Lalru
 Jhande Majra
 Dappar
 Machhli Kalan
 Chandigarh

See also
 Sahibzada Ajit Singh Nagar Assembly Constituency

References

External links 

 Official website of SAS Nagar district
 SAS Nagar subdivisions

Districts of Punjab, India
 
2006 establishments in Punjab, India